Bridgewater or Bridgwater may refer to:

Companies
 Bridgewater Associates, global investment manager
 Bridgewater Systems, Canadian software company

Education
 Bridgewater College, Virginia, United States
 Bridgewater High School (disambiguation)
 Bridgewater State University, Massachusetts
 Bridgewater-Raynham Regional High School, Massachusetts, United States

People 
 Bridgewater (surname)
 Earl of Bridgewater and Duke of Bridgewater, UK peerage

Places

Australia 
 Bridgewater, South Australia
 Bridgewater, Tasmania, suburb of Hobart
 Bridgewater On Loddon, Victoria
 Cape Bridgewater, Victoria, Australia

Canada 
 Bridgewater, Nova Scotia

United Kingdom 
 Bridgwater, town and civil parish in Somerset
 Bridgwater (UK Parliament constituency) which existed from 1885 to 2010
 Bridgwater and West Somerset (UK Parliament constituency), current constituency for this area
 RHS Garden Bridgewater, Greater Manchester

United States 
 Bridgewater, Connecticut
 Bridgewater (CDP), Connecticut, census-designated place
 Bridgewater, Iowa
 Bridgewater, Maine
 Bridgewater, Massachusetts
 Bridgewater (CDP), Massachusetts, census-designated place
 Bridgewater (MBTA station)
 Bridgewater, Michigan, unincorporated community
 Bridgewater, New Hampshire
 Bridgewater Township, New Jersey, commonly referred to as "Bridgewater"
 Bridgewater, New York, a town
 Bridgewater (CDP), New York, in the town of Bridgewater
 Bridgewater, New York (disambiguation)
 Bridgewater, Pennsylvania
 Bridgewater, South Dakota
 Bridgewater, Vermont
 Bridgewater, Virginia
 Bridgewater Township (disambiguation)
 Bridgewater Historic District (disambiguation)
 Bridgewater Center (disambiguation)

Structures
 Bridgewater Bridge (disambiguation)
 Bridgewater Hall, a concert hall in Manchester
 Bridgewater House (disambiguation)
 Bridgewater Monument, Hertfordshire
 Bridgewater Place, Leeds
 Bridgewater State Hospital, Massachusetts, a hospital for the criminally insane, subject of the film Titicut Follies

Transportation
 , one of four East Indiamen of the British East India Company
 Bridgwater and Taunton Canal, Somerset, England
 Port of Bridgwater, Somerset, England
 Bridgewater Canal, from Preston Brook and Worsley to Manchester, England
 Bridgewater railway line, Adelaide, South Australia, Australia
 Bridgewater station (MBTA), in Bridgewater, Massachusetts, United States
 Bridgewater station (New York), in Bridgewater, New York, United States
 Bridgewater station (NJ Transit), in Bridgewater, New Jersey, United States
 HMS Bridgewater, the name of four ships of the Royal Navy, and one of the Commonwealth of England

See also